Alberto Michán Halbinger (born 2 December 1978) is an Israeli-Mexican Olympic horse rider. Born in Mexico, he competes for Israel. He qualified to represent Israel at the 2020 Summer Olympics in Tokyo.

Biography
Michan was born in Mexico; his family comes from Israel.

He was a finalist at the FEI World Cup Jumping in 2006 and 2007.

He competed in the 2006 and 2014 World Equestrian Games.

He competed for Mexico at the 2008 Summer Olympics in Beijing, both in individual jumping (coming in 29th) and in team jumping (coming in 8th).

He earned a bronze medal in Team Jumping at the 2011 Pan American Games in Guadalajara, Mexico.

At the 2012 Summer Olympics, he tied with Scott Brash and Nick Skelton, both of the team-gold medal-winning United Kingdom, for 5th in individual jumping. He was part of the Mexican team for team jumping, which finished in fifth place.

He qualified to represent Israel at the 2020 Summer Olympics in Tokyo.

References

External links

 
 
 
 
 

1978 births
Living people
Israeli male equestrians
Israeli Jews
Israeli people of Mexican-Jewish descent
Sportspeople from Mexico City
Mexican Jews
Mexican male equestrians
Olympic equestrians of Mexico
Equestrians at the 2008 Summer Olympics
Equestrians at the 2012 Summer Olympics
Pan American Games medalists in equestrian
Pan American Games bronze medalists for Mexico
Central American and Caribbean Games gold medalists for Mexico
Central American and Caribbean Games silver medalists for Mexico
Competitors at the 2002 Central American and Caribbean Games
Equestrians at the 2011 Pan American Games
Central American and Caribbean Games medalists in equestrian
Medalists at the 2011 Pan American Games
Equestrians at the 2020 Summer Olympics
Olympic equestrians of Israel